Julian Juliusz Szymański (10 May 1870 – 8 June 1958)  was a Polish oculist and politician.

He was Marshal of the Senate of the Republic of Poland between 1928 and 1930.

1870 births
1958 deaths
People from Kielce
People from Kielce Governorate
Nonpartisan Bloc for Cooperation with the Government politicians
Senat Marshals of the Second Polish Republic
Senators of the Second Polish Republic (1928–1930)
Senators of the Second Polish Republic (1935–1938)